Hemoglobin variants are mutant forms of hemoglobin in a population, caused by variations in genetics. Some well-known hemoglobin variants such as sickle-cell anemia are responsible for diseases, and are considered hemoglobinopathies. Other variants cause no detectable pathology, and are thus considered non-pathological variants.

Some normal hemoglobin types are; Hemoglobin A (Hb A), which is 95–98% of hemoglobin found in adults, Hemoglobin A2 (Hb A2), which is 2–3% of hemoglobin found in adults, and Hemoglobin F (Hb F), which is found in adults up to 2.5% and is the primary hemoglobin that is produced by the fetus during pregnancy.

Hemoglobin variants occur when there are genetic changes in specific genes, or globins, that cause changes or alterations in the amino acid. They could affect the structure, behavior, the production rate, and/or the stability of that specific gene. Usually there are four genes that code for alpha globin and two genes that code for beta globin. If the genes for alpha chains is mutated, the most common condition that occurs is alpha thalassemia, which causes a decrease in production of that gene. The level of severity  of alpha thalassemia is determined by the number of genes that are affected.

Hemoglobin variants are most often inherited characteristics. First, abnormal beta gene can be inherited in an autosomal recessive fashion. This means that the person who inherits this will have two copies of the altered gene. Both of these genes can be passed to offspring. The next way they can be inherited is in a heterozygous fashion. This means that the person has one normal beta gene and one abnormal beta gene. This person is considered to be a carrier of whichever hemoglobin variant is inherited. Only the abnormal gene can be passed on to offspring in this case. Carriers also do not have to deal with having symptoms or any health concerns. Another way that beta genes can be inherited is in a homozygous fashion. This means that the person has two abnormal beta genes. In this case the person produces the associated hemoglobin variant and may have the symptoms and complications that are associated with they specific hemoglobin variant they have. The severity of the conditions mainly depend on the genetic mutation and it may vary from person to person. The copies of the abnormal beta genes would more than likely be passed to offspring.

Along with lengthy list of common hemoglobin variants, there are some variants that are less common. These variants are considered silent, which means that they have no signs or symptoms. They usually affect the functionality and/or the stability of the hemoglobin molecule. With most of these variants are mutations in the alpha globin gene that result in an abnormally long alpha chain and an unstable hemoglobin molecules.

Hemoglobin F is the primary hemoglobin produced by the fetus. The hemoglobin transports oxygen efficiently in a low oxygen environment. The hemoglobin production stops at birth and decreases to adult levels by the age of one or two. The levels can be normal to increased in beta thalassemia. Hemoglobin F frequently increases in individuals with sickle cell anemia and sickle cell-beta thalassemia. Individuals with sickle cell and increase of Hb F have a milder case of the disease. There are situations where the Hb F is increased. This rare condition is called Hereditary Persistence of Fetal Hemoglobin (HPFH). This is a group of disorders where the Hemoglobin F is increased without signs or clinical features of thalassemia. Some different ethnic groups have different mutations that cause HPFH. Hb F can also be increase by acquired conditions that involve the red blood cells. Elevated Hemoglobin F levels are also associated with Leukemia and myeloproliferative disorders.

Hemoglobin H increases the affinity for oxygen. This means that it holds onto the oxygen instead of releasing it into tissue and cells. Hb H usually occurs in some alpha thalassemia and is composed of four beta globin (protein) chains. This variant is usually produced in response to a severe shortage of alpha chains, and usually cause beta chains to function abnormally.

List of hemoglobin variant examples
 Hb Bassett
 Hb Kansas
 Hb S
 Hb C
 Hb E
 Hb D-Punjab
 Hb O-Arab
 Hb G-Philadelphia
 Hb Hasharon
 Hb Kirklareli - In humans, the Hb-Kirklareli mutation hemoglobin has ~80,000 times greater affinity for carbon monoxide over oxygen resulting in systemic carboxyhemoglobin reaching a sustained level of 16% COHb.  This is as compared to approximately 240 times greater CO affinity over O2 in Hb A.
 Hb Lepore
 Hb M
 Hb F
 Hb Hope
 Hb Pisa
 Hb J
 Hb Barts
 Hb N-Baltimore
 Hemoglobin Chesapeake
 Hemoglobin Louisville
 Hemoglobin Vanvitelli

References

External links
 A syllabus of hemoglobin variants

Red blood cell disorders
Genetic disorders with no OMIM
Hemoglobins
Respiratory physiology